Leon Lai Ming SBS BBS MH (born 11 December 1966), is a Hong Kong actor, film director, businessman and Cantopop singer. He is one of the "Four Heavenly Kings" of Hong Kong pop music. He uses his Chinese name "Li Ming" or "Lai Ming", which literally means "dawn".

Early life
Lai was born in Beijing, China. His parents initially considered Lai Chit as his name, but eventually opted for Lai Ming  instead. He is of Hakka ancestry. His family was originally from Meixian. His parents divorced when he was four. He migrated with his Indonesian Chinese father, Lai Xinsheng, to Hong Kong . At the age of 15, he attended Lewisham College in the United Kingdom, but returned to Hong Kong at 18 in 1984.

Career

Early years
Lai initially worked as a salesperson for a mobile phone company. After being awarded second-runner-up in the 1986 New Talent Singing Awards, Lai received vocal coaching from Dai Si Zong.  In the same year he signed with Capital Artists. He did not release any albums for four years. As a result, his teacher, Dai, arranged to have him signed a contract with Polygram, later known as Universal Music.

Music
In Polygram, he released his first album "Leon" and subsequent album "Meet in the Rain". His debut album went gold. 

In the early stages of his career, he mainly sang Cantopop and Mandarin, but due to the influence of producer Mark Lui, he expanded his repertoire to include popular electronic songs with compelling music videos.  In 1990 he won his first 1990 Jade Solid Gold Top 10 Awards and 1990 RTHK Top 10 Gold Songs Awards. He followed up to win the "Most Popular Male Singer" award in 1993 and 1995 for TVB Jade Solid Gold. In 1996, he collaborated with composer-producer Steve Barakatt on his album "Feel". Two years later in 1998, he became the first Hong Kong singer to reach the Top 10 K-pop chart with the song "After Loving You." 

In 2002 he was selected to sing "Charged Up", the 2002 FIFA World Cup theme song for the Greater China region. In 2004, he became the first Hong Kong singer to represent the territory at the first Asia Song Festival held in South Korea.

Lai was selected to be the ambassador of the 6th Winter Asian Games to be held Changchun in 2007. He sang the Games' theme song and took part in the torch relay. He then joined Michael Wong and Janice Vidal and held a three-day "Magic Live" charity concert at Star Hall, Hong Kong from November 9th to 11th, 2008.

Lai holds his concert at the Hong Kong Coliseum, titled "Leon Lai Talk & Sing 2021 Concert", from Jul 10, 2021, for 9 shows.

Duets
Apart from being a solo artist, Lai has collaborated with other artists. Some of his better known collaborations are "Love Until the End" and "A Happy Family" with Vivian Chow, "Really Wish to Be Like This Forever" and "It's Still You" with Priscilla Chan, "Song of the Star" with Alan Tam, "Never Give Up" with Jacky Cheung, "Why did I let you go?" with Janice Vidal.

Company founder and singer
In 2004, Lai formed a new record production company, "A Music", East Asia Record Production Company Limited, with Peter Lam. The first album produced by the company, "Dawn" was released in September of that year. The album, "Dawn", was released with minimum promotion as Lai went to Mainland China for a movie shoot on the day of the album's release.

In 2005, Lai invited Taiwanese music producer Jonathan Lee to produce his new Mandarin album "A Story". However, by doing so he had to give up the opportunity for a lead role in a big budget Taiwan movie "Gui Si" due to conflicts in his schedules.

He returned to the Hong Kong Coliseum on 13 April 2007 to perform in his one night only Leon 4 in Love Concert, where he performed not only his own hits but also hits from the other three heavenly kings. He performed a total of 18 songs, all of which are newly arranged by Mark Lui. He subsequently released an album titled "4 in Love" on 3 May 2007, comprising 16 of the 18 songs he had performed at the concert.

In 2004, Paciwood co-invested with Esun Group to develop a music record company, East Asia Record Production Limited, with the music label Amusic.

Acting career
After the New Talent Singing Awards, he had some opportunities to star in a few TV series. On one occasion, he went for the filming of a romantic serials titled, Fengyun Era, in Taiwan. There was a stark contrast in height between Lai and the popular lead actress who is only 160 cm tall. The actress then demanded that Lai squat while filming so as to make up for the height differences. Lai had to act through all the scenes with the actress while squatting, but he had to endure it as he was not popular at the time. Not long afterwards his new TVB series, The Breaking Point, turned out to be a resounding success and propelled him to widespread fame in Hong Kong and Taiwan.

In 1996, Lai was nominated for the Best Actor award at the 16th Hong Kong Film Awards for the film Comrades: Almost a Love Story.  The following year in 1997, he won the award of Best Original Song for the film Eighteen Springs both at the Golden Horse Film Festival and Hong Kong Film Awards.  He was again nominated for the Best Actor and Best Original Film Song award for the film City of Glass (玻璃之城) in 1999, but he only won the award for the latter, which he shared with Albert Leung and Dick Lee.

Lai was considered by Lee Ang to act as Li Mu Bai in the film Crouching Tiger, Hidden Dragon, but he had to turn down the offer as he had an advertising contract and live concert about to start, which would not match his shaven head look as was required for the role.

He collaborated with Cecilia Cheung 張柏芝 in 2001 for the first time in the Wong Jing directed romantic comedy film, Everyday Is Valentine. In the film, Lai played a serial liar.

In 2002, Lai took the spotlight at the Golden Horse Awards, the Chinese-language version of the Oscars in Taiwan. He won Best Actor for Three: Going Home. Lai played a minor role as Superintendent Yeung Kam Wing in Infernal Affairs III in 2003. In 2004, he starred with Faye Wong 王菲 in the romantic film Leaving Me, Loving You, the story of which he co-wrote with Wilson Yip and he was also the creative/production controller of the film. However, the movie was a flop as it raked in HK$ 10,529,501 at the box office. Still in that same year he was ranked 8th on the China Celebrity 100 list released by the Chinese edition of Forbes.

In 2005 Lai acted as one of the seven warriors in the Tsui Hark directed wuxia film, Seven Swords. In the same year in the film Moonlight in Tokyo, he played a developmentally challenged Chinese man who pretends to be a Korean gigolo in Japan. 

In 2006 Lai starred alongside Fan Bingbing and Rene Liu in a love and horror, thriller film titled The Matrimony where he played a cinematographer Shen Junchu, the love interest of Manli and Sansan. JunChu was pressurised into marrying Sansan after the untimely demise of his true love Manli in an accident. The film was released on 8 February 2007. 

In 2007, Lai starred alongside Kelly Chen, Donnie Yen and Guo Xiaodong in the Ching Siu-tung film An Empress and the Warriors. He acted as a woodland medicine man who has a romantic relationship with a princess. Lai and Kelly Chen sang the theme song, "Fly With Your Dreams" written by Albert Leung and composed by Mark Lui.

He underwent training in Peking Opera for playing the lead role as Méi Lánfāng in the biographical film Forever Enthralled which was directed by Chen Kaige. He directed the music video for the film where he and Zhang Ziyi sang the theme song, "You Understand My Love". For the first time in his career, Lai played the role of a beggar in the Peter Chan directed film Bodyguards and Assassins. For his success a wax figure of Lai was revealed at Madame Tussauds Hong Kong.

Community
Apart from being an actor and singer, Lai is actively involved in the Community Chest. In the 1990s, he began serious charity work when his father was diagnosed with rectal cancer. The doctors said it was incurable. After the surgical operation, his father survived. When the Cancer Research Foundation and the UN organization approached him for help, he started getting actively involved in charity work.

His first work with UNICEF was a China polio eradication project in 1993. He raised substantial funds accruing from his supporters, fans, and concert ticket sales. In July 1994, he was appointed the International UNICEF Goodwill Ambassador, thus becoming the first Hong Kong citizen to be given this position. Since 1994, he has been involved in various fundraising activities of The Hong Kong Committee for UNICEF (HKCU). These activities include seven charity concerts, three charity chocolate sales, and charity walkathons. Lai, along with HKCU representatives, visited Rwanda, Gansu of China, and Brazil to study the work of UNICEF and to help promote public awareness to help children. In December 1995, he was appointed as "UNICEF Special Representative to Youth" at the New York headquarters recognizing his contributions for the welfare of the children.

Lai has also been elected as one of The Ten Outstanding Young Persons (TOYP) in 1997, giving him a formal recognition of his professional endeavors and commitment to the community. He bought the first donation ticket, numbered 000001, at a "Children's Education Fund Raising Campaign" launch event at Tsuen Wan PARKnSHOP's Skyline Superstore in 2001 to encourage people to contribute to a meaningful social cause. The funds raised were donated to the Community Chest.

He was awarded the Medal of Honour (M.H.) on 12 October 2003 by Tung Chee-Hwa, the Chief Executive of Hong Kong.

Since his decision not to receive any music award in Hong Kong, he has not appeared on the TVB Jade Gold Solid Awards ceremony even as a guest, but to secure more funds for charity, he agreed to perform in the ceremony as a guest performer on 8 January 2005. On 13 May the same year, Lai collaborated with Mark Lui to compose the song "8858". The song was used as the promotional song for the China Children and Teenagers' Fund (CCTF). The title of song means "Help Me (which sounds like 'bang bang wo ba' in Putonghua)" and the number "8858" represents the SMS number people can use to donate the money.

In December 2005, Lai appeared in a Hong Kong government television advertisement in support of a gradual political reform package tabled by the ruling government rather than rapid political reform. This was the first time he got himself involved in a politically motivated advertisement.

Personal life
In 2008, Lai secretly married model Gaile Lok in Las Vegas at the Wynn Hotel, with his manager and assistant acting as witnesses. On 3rd October 2012, the couple announced the end of their four-year marriage. Their joint statement stated that there were "different philosophies in life" which caused the divorce.

In 2017, Lai formed a relationship with his label assistant and later sales manager Chan Wing-yee, who is 19 years his junior and also a divorcee. On 22nd April 2018, Chan gave birth to his daughter.

Commercial anthem incident
In 2000, Lai's song All Day Love got him into trouble with the Chinese authorities for drawing passages from the Chinese National Anthem, March of the Volunteers. The starting tune was accused of plagiarism from the anthem. Lai was warned against using the song for commercial purposes.

Discography
(# Literal translation)

Filmography

Film

Television series

Concerts
At Hong Kong Coliseum:

(Note: # indicate literal translation)

Source:

At Central Harbourfront Event Space, Central Harbourfront:

Awards and nominations
Lai was rewarded for his loyalty to the Hong Kong Government in July 2019 by the award of its second highest honour, the Silver Bauhinia Star.  The award highlighted particular mention of "his participation in the promotional footage for the Hong Kong Mortgage Corporation Annuity Plan in 2018".

Lai's industry awards and nominations are listed in the tables below.

Source:

References

Sources

External links

1966 births
Living people
Male actors from Beijing
Cantopop singers
Hong Kong Buddhists
Hong Kong male film actors
Hong Kong male singers
Hong Kong Mandopop singers
Korean-language singers of Hong Kong
Hong Kong people of Hakka descent
People from Meixian District
Hong Kong male television actors
Singers from Beijing
New Talent Singing Awards contestants
20th-century Hong Kong male actors
21st-century Hong Kong male actors
Hakka musicians
Participants in Chinese reality television series
Hong Kong idols